The Public Commission on the Oregon Legislature (PCOL) was a group of 30 citizens in the U.S. state of Oregon charged with developing recommendations on how to improve the Oregon Legislative Assembly. The 2005 session of the legislature established the commission with Senate Bill 1084. The bill, which declared an emergency, took effect upon its passage, when it was signed by Governor Ted Kulongoski on July 29, 2005.

The PCOL submitted its final report for the consideration of the 74th legislature on November 13, 2006. The 74th legislature implemented several of the recommendations.

Reception, impact and criticism 
The PCOL's recommendation to establish an "open" primary (also known as a nonpartisan blanket primary) was taken up by two former Secretaries of State, Phil Keisling and Norma Paulus, in the form of a ballot initiative. The effort narrowly missed qualifying for the 2006 general elections ballot, but a slightly modified version qualified for the 2008 general election ballot as ballot measure 65.

The Bend Bulletin criticized the PCOL's recommendations regarding the initiative and referendum system in an editorial, noting that the system was outside the PCOL's purview, and taking issue with the selective nature of the recommendations.

Recommendations to renovate the Oregon State Capitol were acted upon by the 2007 session of the legislature, and were noted in advertisements in the 2008 U.S. Senate race.

Recommendations 
The commission's report included recommendations on the following topics:

Fundamental reform: 
 Open Primary
 Nonpartisan Legislature
 Nonpartisan State Controller
 Redistricting Commission
 Funding Government Standards and Practices Commission
 Initiative Reform
 Campaign Finance
 Legislator Compensation

Institutional reform: 
 Annual Sessions and Session Structure
 Partisanship
 Staffing Legislative Offices
 Hiring Family Members
 Alcohol Consumption
 Public Access

Reforming legislative operations:
 Committees
 Bills and Amendments
 Program Evaluation
 Budget Notes

Improving facilities and technology:
 Capitol Renovation and Comprehensive Facilities Plan
 Wireless Access
 Use of Technology
 Oregon Channel
 Audio and Video Hardware
 Security

Commission members

See also 
 Oregon State Senate
 Oregon House of Representatives

References 

Oregon Legislative Assembly
2005 establishments in Oregon